Dhritiman Mukherjee is an Indian professional nature, wildlife and conservation photographer. He is a certified advance open water diver, certified ice-diver and certified mountaineer.

His works are regularly published in several national and international prints and digital media including BBC, National Geographic, New York Times, Lonely Planet, WWF, London Geographic, Outlook Traveler, Telegraph, and The Guardian.

Dhritiman is the ambassador of Roundglass and the founder of Saevus Magazine. He was appointed by Sony India as a Sony Explorer on 28 August 2019 He was also one of jury members of the professional category in the 6th National Award Photography Awards hosted by the Government of India.

Career 
Dhritiman started his career in nature, wildlife and conservation photography in the year 2000. Since then, he has traveled extensively to cover wildlife across India and the world. Photographers in India, at that time, largely focused on larger mammals. However, as Dhritiman had the added skills of mountaineering and adventured to lesser known areas such as the Himalayas, mountains of north east, etc. he started the journey of capturing rare and difficult species in India such as the Bengal Florican, Lesser Florican, Tragopans, Orange Bullfinch and Narcondam hornbill to name a few. He, therefore, pioneered the way for photographers in India to focus on rarer and lesser known species. His philosophy is to contribute to science and create awareness on conservation of wildlife, natural resource management and environment protection through his work.

In 2010, a team of eight people including Dhritiman traveled within the Great Himalayan National Park to observe rare peasants and the brown bear. On this expedition Dhritiman captured an image of the Western Tragopan, making him one of the first wildlife photographers to capture the Western Tragopan in the wild at that time.

He spends more than 280 days every year in the field and he has been doing this for last 20 years. He has dived in the frozen Baikal lake in Siberia to capture the elusive Nerpa seals. He has photographed giant American crocodiles off the Mexican coastline in the Caribbean Sea. He has dived with Anacondas in the swamps of Brazil. He has shot all the five sharks that are considered most dangerous in terms of human casualties — the Great White Shark, the Tiger Shark, the Bull Shark, the Oceanic White Tip and the Hammerhead. His photograph of an Orange Bullfinch taken at Dachigam National Park is the only clear photo taken of the species. He has scaled Congolese mountains to get haunting images of the mountain gorillas, swum through icy Norwegian fjords to shoot Orcas, captured the American crocodiles in Banco Chinchorro off the Mexican coast, and photographed almost every kind of predator in its natural habitat.

Dhritiman is one of the very few nature, wildlife and conservation photographers who has dived in frigid waters of the Arctic and Antarctica to capture the aquatic life. He has traveled to Svalbard and Greenland and captured the wildlife and aquatic activity in great detail. He has captured Crab-eater Seals, Orcas, Penguins to name a few.

He has also taken iconic pictures of the Snow Leopards in Spiti Valley and in Ladakh which are arguably the first detailed pictorial documentation of the most enigmatic animal in the wild (non-camera trap).

Dhritiman undertook a 100-day journey across the Himalayas in 2016 along with Shantanu Moitra which was documented and published on YouTube called "100 days in Himalayas" produced by Roundglass.

He is a frequently invited by several educational organisations to speak about conservation and wildlife to their students. Dhritiman has given talks to several policy makers, students, wildlife enthusiasts and photographers in institutes like Institute for Scientific and Engineering Research, Wildlife Institute of India, University of Pittsburgh  etc.

Personal life 
Dhritiman was born in Barasat, sub-urban Kolkata, to Sadhan Mukherjee, an employee of Government of West Bengal, and Sandhya Mukherjee. His father was also a social worker and a humanitarian. He worked extensively to uplift his community and people in dire need. Dhritiman has been found often accrediting his humility towards his work to his father's humanitarian work. Dhritiman has two older sisters i.e., Nandini Mukherjee and Malini Chakraborty and is the youngest of three siblings. His parents have been a constant source of inspiration since his childhood, so much so that, quite unlikely for his time and upbringing, he was left to himself to choose his career or, rather, follow his passion. A reflection of his parents support reflected when they sold off a portion of their family home to help Dhritiman buy his first camera.

Apart from his parents, Dhritiman has also accredited Moushumi Ghosh, who has been a guardian and second mother and largely instrumental in him becoming a successful nature, wildlife and conservation photographer.

Dhritiman's formative years in developing his interest in wildlife also took place from to his association with Climbers Circle - an institute where he learnt his mountaineering skills and with Prakriti Samsad - a council of nature observers and research activities.

Education 
Dhritiman completed his higher secondary from Barasat Peary Charan Sarkar Government High School. He went on to graduate in Bachelor of Science from Barasat Government College. He has had no formal education in photography and is a self-taught photographer.

Awards 
Across the course of his 20 (twenty) years in wildlife and nature photography, Dhritiman has collected several awards and accolades. Some of the essential awards are as mentioned hereunder:

Publications 
Dhritiman has co-authored a book with Dr. Asad R. Rahmani called Magical Biodiversity of India. The book takes the readers through a journey of 15 Indian landscapes. The book represents the biodiversity present in India from larger species to smaller species. Dhritiman's work has also been covered across several known platforms across the globe. Some of the publishers of his works include National Geographic, The Indian Express, The Guardian, The Times, and New Scientist.

References

External links
 
Official Facebook Page
Official Facebook Profile

1975 births
Living people
People from Barasat